Zantedeschia rehmannii, the pink arum lily, pink calla, or red calla lily, is a herbaceous ornamental plant in the family Araceae. It (or its cultivar(s)) is a recipient of the Royal Horticultural Society's Award of Garden Merit.

Description

The spathe on this summer flowering Zantedeschia is mauve to rose-purple with paler margins, enclosing a yellow spadix. Its green unmarked leaves are semi erect and not arrow shaped as in other species.

It grows to 40 cm (15 in) tall and 30 cm (12 in) wide. The plant is slightly frost hardy, preferring a well composted soil in an area protected from strong winds and in part shade.

References

rehmannii
Flora of Southern Africa
Garden plants of Southern Africa